Robert Brock Berryhill (born September 22, 1984) is an American songwriter, record producer, engineer, and musician. He has produced, co-written and engineered for Kane Brown, Parmalee, Halestorm, Tyler Ward, Twenty One Pilots, Jake Owen, Darryl Worley, A Rocket to the Moon, Versa Emerge, Matt Hires, Tyler Wood (from Discovery Channels hit show Moonshiners).

Brock Berryhill was born in Winter Park, Florida, on September 22, 1984. He begin playing drums and guitar at the age of 12 and started playing guitar locally for the band Mindscar at the age of 15. At the age of 19 his band Hand to Hand was signed to Lifeforce Records in Germany and released their debut album "A Perfect Way to Say Goodbye" produced by James Paul Wisner (Dashboard Confessional, The Academy Is, Paramore) where he spent the next four years touring Europe and the United States. After departing Hand to Hand, he begin working as an assistant engineer for James Paul Wisner while building is recording studio "Starlight Studios" with his co-founder Evan Coffman.

In 2015, Berryhill moved to Nashville, Tennessee, and in 2016 signed an exclusive publishing deal with Warner/Chappell Nashville. Since moving to Nashville he has received a Gold Record for A Rocket to the Moon's "Like We Use To" single as it was certified gold by the RIAA. He has written songs with Chris Young, LoCash, Parmalee, Kane Brown, Tyler Ward, Love and Theft, & Devin Dawson.

Discography

References 

American country record producers
Living people
1984 births